The Office of Global Maritime Situational Awareness (OGMSA) is a United States interagency office tasked with global maritime domain awareness.

OGMSA  focuses on interagency coordination within U.S. federal, state, and local governments. It is to increase international cooperation and improve commercial cooperation to facilitate maritime information sharing.

Major Initiatives 

 Global Maritime Information Sharing Symposium (GMISS)
 Maritime Safety and Security Information System (MSSIS)
 Maritime Domain Awareness Enterprise Hubs
 Interagency Investment Strategy Monitoring, Reporting and Coordination

References 
 U.S. National Security Presidential Directive NSPD-41/Homeland Security Presidential Directive HSPD-13 (2004)
 U.S. National Strategy for Maritime Security (2005)
 U.S. National Plan to Achieve Maritime Domain Awareness for the National Strategy for Maritime Security (2005)
 U.S. National Concept of Operations for Maritime Domain Awareness (2007)
 National Maritime Domain Awareness Requirements and Capabilities Working Group (2005) National MDA Study Interagency Investment Strategy

United States federal boards, commissions, and committees